Magdaleno Mercado Gutiérrez (4 April 1944 – 6 March 2020) was a Mexican professional football midfielder who played for Mexico in the 1966 FIFA World Cup. He also played for Club Atlas.

References

External links
FIFA profile

1944 births
Mexican footballers
Mexico international footballers
Association football midfielders
Atlas F.C. footballers
Liga MX players
1966 FIFA World Cup players
2020 deaths